Best Gold, Toshiko Akiyoshi '89~'96 is a compilation album released by Nippon Crown Records.  It contains tracks taken from the first 7 Nippon Crown releases of jazz pianist Toshiko Akiyoshi in small combo settings.

Track listing
"Long Yellow Road" – 7:15 (from Time Stream: Toshiko Plays Toshiko)
"Autumn Leaves" – 5:18 (from Four Seasons)
"Blue Bossa" – 5:02 (from Chic Lady)
"Amapola" – 5:30 (from Yes, I Have No 4 Beat Today)
"Morning Of Carnival" – 7:44 (from Dig)
"Tempus Fugit" – 4:15 (from Remembering Bud)
"Round About Midnight" – 6:33 (from Night and Dream)

Personnel
Toshiko Akiyoshi – piano
others (see individual album listings)

References / External Links
Nippon Crown CRCJ-9142 

1998 compilation albums
Toshiko Akiyoshi compilation albums